The Congress of Cuba was the legislature of Cuba from 1902 until the Cuban revolution of 1959.

The Congress consisted of the 150-member Chamber of Representatives (Cámara de Representantes)  and the 54-member Senate (Cámara del Senado).

The first Cuban Congress met for the first time on May 5, 1902. Generally, Congress held at least two sessions during a given year. Meetings were interrupted by the Second Occupation of Cuba after the session of September 28, 1906. Following the re-establishment of Cuban based government in 1909 it met without interruption from January 13, 1909 until April 1933, a few months before President Gerardo Machado was overthrown. During the Presidency of Ramon Grau the country's legislative apparatus was largely undertaken by Grau's administration under the auspices of the student revolutionary junta. Commencing with the provisional presidency of Carlos Mendieta a Consejo de estado (Council of State) undertook advisory legislative functions. The Council of State was abolished in April, 1936 when the Cuban Congress finally resumed its session after 3 years of inactivity.

Presidents of the Senate 1902-1958

Presidents of the Chamber of Representatives 1902-1958

See also
National Assembly of People's Power - Unicameral legislature since 1976
History of Cuba

References

History of Cuba
Defunct bicameral legislatures
Politics of Cuba
1902 establishments in Cuba
1959 disestablishments in Cuba